Thembisa, formerly Tembisa, is a large township situated to the north of Kempton Park on the East Rand, Gauteng, South Africa. It was established in 1957 when black people were resettled from Alexandra and other areas in Edenvale, Kempton Park, Midrand and Germiston.

History
The township was formed in 1957, under the administration of the Germiston city council which oversaw the forced relocation of black people from locations deemed to be in white areas, such as Dindela, Tikkieline, Phelindaba, and Modderfontein which spanned Edenvale, Modderfontein and Kempton Park. It is the second largest township in Gauteng, following Soweto.

In 1977 the government initiated the Community Councils and in 1982 upgraded them to Town Councils, under the Black Local Authorities Act. The government vested limited powers on these councils but without financial muscle. Therefore, to raise revenue for purposes of developing the townships, the councils increased rent and service charges. This caused the residents in different townships, including Thembisa, to establish civic structures to resist the rent and service charge increases.

On 26 July 2016, residents were caught off guard when a tornado hit the area. The twister started in Kempton Park and moved over to Thembisa, causing the most destruction here. Around 20 individuals were seriously injured and in excess of 400 were left destitute. A standout amongst the most noticeable sights was the damage caused to the Phumulani Mall, where the rooftop crumbled after the tornado passed through it.

Transport

Road 
Thembisa is connected to Pretoria in the north and Kempton Park in the south via two main roads, namely the M57 Metropolitan Route and the R21 e-toll Highway. The R21 Highway and the M57 Route both bypass Thembisa to the east.

The northern part of Thembisa is connected to Midrand in the west by the R562 Route (Winnie Madikizela-Mandela Road). The R562 forms the boundary between Thembisa and Olifantsfontein (Clayville).

The main route through the Thembisa town centre is the M18 Route, which is formed by two roads (Andrew Mapheto Drive and Reverend RTJ Namane Drive). It connects Thembisa with Olifantsfontein and Centurion in the north and with Chloorkop (near Kempton Park West) in the south-west.

Rail 
The main Metrorail route between Pretoria in the north and Johannesburg via Germiston in the south has a station in Thembisa east, namely the Oakmoor station. Just south of the Oakmoor station is a branch rail which heads north-west into the township, with the stations on the branch rail being Thembisa in the east, Limindlela in the center and Leralla in the west.

Notable people

 Lerato Chabangu - soccer player
 Panyaza Lesufi - Premier of Gauteng
 Tsietsi Mahoa -soccer player
 George Maluleka - soccer player
 Thabo Matlaba - soccer player
 Pearl Modiadie - TV presenter, radio DJ, producer
 Rosemary Ndlovu - serial killer
 Refiloe Nt'sekhe - Deputy Federal Chairperson of the Democratic Alliance (South Africa) (DA)
 Jerry Sikhosana former soccer player, most famously for Orlando Pirates F.C., coach
 Claude Tshidibi - rugby union player
 Mthokozisi Yende - soccer player
 Lady Zamar - singer, songwriter
 Themba Zwane - soccer player
 Moses Taiwa Molelekwa - Pianist
 Aymos - singer, songwriter

References

Townships in Gauteng
Populated places in Ekurhuleni
Populated places established in 1957
East Rand